Vanguard Visionaries is a compilation album by American banjoist Alison Brown, released in 2007.

History
Vanguard Records had a high-profile during the 1960s folk revival and released music by many folk artists such as Doc Watson, Odetta,  John Fahey and many others. To celebrate their 60th anniversary, Vanguard released a series of artist samplers called Vanguard Visionaries.

Track listing 
All compositions by Alison Brown unless otherwise noted
 "Leaving Cottondale" – 2:32
 "Simple Pleasures" – 2:51
 "Wolf Moon" – 2:52
 "Shoot the Dog" – 3:24
 "Chicken Road" – 4:28
 "View from Above" – 4:54
 "Look Left" – 5:00
 "Cara's Way" – 5:18
 "G Bop (Brown, Burr, Reed, West)" – 3:08
 "Without Anastasia" – 3:13

Personnel
 Alison Brown – banjo, guitar
 Garry West – bass
 John R. Burr – piano
 Rick Reed – drums, percussion

References

Alison Brown albums
2007 compilation albums
Vanguard Records albums